Edoardo Carlo Winspeare Guicciardi (born 14 September 1965) is an Italian actor, screenwriter and film director. He has directed seven films since 1996.

Selected filmography

References

External links 

1965 births
Living people
Italian male film actors
Italian film directors